J Rio Ramirez (born February 6, 1998) is a Professional American/Mexican soccer player who currently plays for the Dallas Sidekicks in the Major Arena Soccer League.

Playing career
Ramirez played with NPSL side Fort Worth Vaqueros for three seasons with (6 goals), as well as a spell with Major Arena Soccer League side Mesquite Outlaws during the 2019–20 season having (4 goals). On April 22, 2021, Ramirez signed a one-year deal with USL League One side North Texas SC. He made his debut on May 2, 2021, appearing as an 88th-minute substitute during a 4–0 loss to Greenville Triumph. North Texas went on to lose in the quarterfinals, and he was not signed the following year. 

On December 30, 2021, Ramirez signed with the Major Arena Soccer League's Dallas Sidekicks. With minimal games and minutes played by Ramirez, Dallas Sidekicks were eliminated by Ontario Fury also in the quarterfinals.

References 

1998 births
American soccer players
Association football defenders
Living people
National Premier Soccer League players
North Texas SC players
Soccer players from Texas
Sportspeople from Arlington, Texas
USL League One players
Dallas Sidekicks (2012–present) players
Major Arena Soccer League players